HMAS Taipan was an auxiliary vessel operated by the Royal Australian Navy (RAN) during the Second World War. She was the Japanese vessel Bandeong Maru, which was captured off Cape Leveque, West Australia in August 1944 and commissioned on 14 August 1945. She was used by the Services Reconnaissance Department and was paid off in 1945, before being sold to the Council for Scientific and Industrial Research (CSIR) in June 1947. She was later sold into private ownership and re-named Shangri La.

Notes

References
Naval Historical Society of Australia - "On this day" (1945)

Auxiliary ships of the Royal Australian Navy
1940s ships